Kris, also known as Kris Jenner Show, is a former talk show broadcast on the Fox network hosted by Kris Jenner. It premiered on July 15, 2013 on Fox stations in Los Angeles; New York City; Charlotte, North Carolina; Dallas, Texas; Minneapolis, Minnesota; and Phoenix, Arizona. The show finished its six-week trial on August 23, 2013. The show was not picked up for a full season.
On January 17, 2014, FOX officially announced that the show had been cancelled.

The show is most notable for having her son-in-law Kanye West as a guest on the final episode, in which he released the first photos of North West, his child with Kim Kardashian. It was Kanye's first television interview in three years and was one hour long. The episode had the highest ratings of the six-week test run.

References

2010s American television talk shows
2013 American television series debuts
2013 American television series endings
English-language television shows
First-run syndicated television programs in the United States
Television shows related to the Kardashian–Jenner family
Television series by 20th Century Fox Television